Orders, decorations, and medals of Montenegro is a system of awards in Montenegro. The Government of Montenegro established a national honours system consisting of orders, decorations, and medals approximately a year after the independence of Montenegro in 2006.

The President of Montenegro is the titular head of the national honours system and decrees and invests each honoree on the advice and approval of the Government of Montenegro.

National honours

Each order consists of several grades and each honour may be bestowed on nationals and foreigners alike.

Presidential honours
Included within the National Honours Act,  is the power of the President to award the Presidential Award of Recognition to prominent Montenegrin and foreign nationals who have served the President in a high capacity.  This award is also granted to foreign statesmen and some resident foreign ambassadors of EU and NATO countries at the conclusion of their mission.  It consists of a Presidential diploma.

Dynastic awards
The Kingdom of Montenegro issued its own royal awards up until the monarchy's abolition in 1918. Today, the head of Montenegrin Royal House, Prince Nicholas of Montenegro, has continued to award dynastic honours and this practice is recognised by the Montenegrin State.  The three dynastic Orders bestowed by the Royal House are:

Order of Prince Danilo I
Order of Saint Peter of Cetinje
Order of Petrović-Njegoš
Red Cross Order
Order of the Freedom of Montenegro (founded in exile in 1919)

References

External links

Office of The President of Montenegro.

 
Government of Montenegro